Sergey Yuryevich Shustitsky is a Soviet and Russian musician, TV presenter, showman. He has been a member of the Composers' Union (since 1985) and is an Honored Artist of the Russian Federation (2000).

In 1982 he graduated from the Moscow Conservatory, in 1990–1991 he trained in the US, worked as an arranger for the Paramount studios, 20th Century Fox.

On television in 1979. He is a member of the Russian Television Academy.

He has composed several symphonic and chamber works.

References

External links 
   Сергей Юрьевич Шустицкий
 Сергей Шустицкий: С удовольствием кручу романы с тайскими красотками!

1958 births
Living people
People from East Berlin
Honored Artists of the Russian Federation
Moscow Conservatory alumni
Russian male actors
Soviet television presenters
Russian television presenters
Soviet male composers
Russian male composers
Russian film score composers
Male film score composers
20th-century Russian male musicians